Robinson Ekspeditionen 2010 was the thirteenth season of the Danish version of the Swedish show Expedition Robinson. This season premiered on September 6, 2010.

Contestants

Season summary 
The major twist this season is that the contestants have been divided into tribes with half of each tribe being "Masters" and the other half being "Slaves". The contestants individual statuses were determined in a challenge they took part in before they were divided into tribes. The twelve members of each gender competed in a challenge against each other with the five winners being the masters of their tribe and each getting to pick one of the seven challenge losers from the other tribe as their slave. Through the slave selection process four contestants, Anja Balle, Gitte Behrendt, Vincent Muir, and Hector Nielsen, were eliminated and sent to "Utopia" to compete against each other as well as future eliminated contestants in order to earn a spot back in the game. Following the elimination, the "Tenga" and "Minang" tribes were formed with the Minang tribe being composed of the female winners and their slaves and the Tenga tribe of the male winners and their slaves. 

In episode 2, a tribal swap took place in which most of the contestants swapped tribes. 

In episode 3, no elimination took place due to Ali Ghiace's voluntary exit. Also in episode 3, it was revealed that, like last year, there is a mole competing in the game. With this news came that of the mole being the only person eligible to vote for two people at the third tribal council. 

In episode 5, both tribes competed in an elimination competition which would lead to players from each tribe being eliminated. Ultimately, it Maiken Andersen and Bjørn Lambertsen from Minang and Ann Applegren from Tenga who lost the challenge and were eliminated and sent to Utopia.

In episode 9, the two tribes merged and five contestants from Utopia (Anja Balle, Diana Andersen, Germaine Nielsen, Hector Nielsen, and Reda Zamzam) returned to the game.

In episode 10, Germaine lost a challenge and was eliminated. In episode 11, Anja and Reda were sent to Utopia where Anja lost a duel and was eliminated. In episode 13, all Utopia contestants competed in a duel which Hans "HC" Nørager lost and was eliminated. 

In episode 14, the recently voted out Gitte Benherdt along with all of the remaining Utopia residents competed in the final duel of the season for a spot in the final four. Ultimately, Hans Ravnholt won the duel while the others were eliminated in the following order: Gitte Behrendt, Diana Andersen, Jens Bach, Mette Egeberg, Henriette Nielsen, Hector Nielsen, and finally Jakob Jensen.

In the final, episode of the season the final four faced off in series of three challenges to determine the winner. As the winner of the first challenge Zabrina Kondrup was immune from the second, elimination challenge. Søren "Nicolai" Korshøj became the final contestant to be eliminated when he lost the second challenge.

Voting history

 On day one the contestants took part in challenge to determine the tribal groups. The five men and five women who won the challenge would become the masters of their tribes. The masters would then pick five slaves to complete their tribes. The two men and two women not selected as slaves were eliminated.

 At the first immunity challenge both tribes had to bet two of their slaves. At the conclusion of the challenge it was revealed that the masters of the losing tribe would have to choose which of the two bet slaves would be eliminated.

 At the first tribal council only the masters of the Rulers tribe were allowed to vote or receive votes. Slaves could neither vote or be voted for.

 At the second tribal council Ali could not be voted for as he won individual immunity at the immunity challenge.

 At the third tribal council HK could not be voted for as she had immunity having recently joined the game. In reality, HK was immune as she was a mole working for production.

 As a twist, there was a double elimination at the third tribal council. The two contestants that received the most votes would be eliminated.

 After the initial vote at the fourth tribal council it was revealed that Tenga's votes would not count. Minang then voted to eliminate a member from Tenga.

 Following the temporary evacuation of the contestants HK left the game. As her last move as the mole she was given the power to eliminate one contestant. She chose to eliminate Ann.

 At the fifth tribal council members from both tribes voted for any contestant they wanted. Henriette, Maiken and Zamzam were immune as they were given immunity talismans from Bjørn.

 In episode six Hans Ole, Henriette, Maiken and Mette faced off in a duel. Mette won the duel earning immunity at the next tribal council. As punishment for losing the duel only Hans Ole, Henriette and Maiken could receive votes at tribal council.

Utopia Final Standings

External links
http://tv3.dk/robinson/medvirkende

Robinson Ekspeditionen seasons
2010 Danish television seasons
Danish reality television series